Binzen is a municipality in the southwestern German Federal State of Baden-Württemberg, part of the district Lörrach. The town's coat of arms was granted on 29 August 1967.  The blazon of the arms is Azure a Garb Or on a Chief Gules a Rising Sun in Splendour Or.

References

Lörrach (district)
Baden